Kyabé is a city in the Moyen-Chari Region, Chad. It is the administrative center of the Lac Iro Department. There is an airport with the name of the city, Kyabé Airport.

Population
Population by years:

References

Populated places in Chad